Abago is a genus of flies from the family Calliphoridae. It is now considered a synonym of Calliphora.

Species
Abago rohdendorfi Grunin, 1966 (Synonym of Calliphora rohdendorfi (Grunin, 1966))

References 

Calliphoridae
Parasitic flies
Parasites of birds
Oestroidea genera